Ultimate Fighting Championship rankings, which were introduced in February 2013, are generated by a voting panel made up of media members. These media members are asked to vote for whom they feel are the top fighters in the UFC by weight class and pound-for-pound. A fighter is only eligible to be voted on if they are of active status in the UFC. A fighter can appear in more than one weight division at a time. The champion and interim champion are considered to be in top positions of their respective divisions and therefore are not eligible for voting by weight class. However, the champions can be voted on for the pound-for-pound rankings.

Legend

Men's pound for pound
Rankings updated on March 13, 2023, after UFC Fight Night: Yan vs. Dvalishvili.

Women's pound for pound
Rankings updated on March 13, 2023, after UFC Fight Night: Yan vs. Dvalishvili.

Heavyweight

Weight limit: (206 to 265 lb; 93 kg to 120 kg)

Rankings updated on March 13, 2023, after UFC Fight Night: Yan vs. Dvalishvili.

Light Heavyweight

Weight limit: (186 to 205 lbs; 84 to 93 kg)

Rankings updated on March 13, 2023, after UFC Fight Night: Yan vs. Dvalishvili.

Middleweight

Weight limit: (171 to 185 lb; 77 to 84 kg)

Rankings updated on March 13, 2023, after UFC Fight Night: Yan vs. Dvalishvili.

Welterweight

Weight limit: (156 to 170 lb; 71 to 77 kg)

Rankings updated on March 13, 2023, after UFC Fight Night: Yan vs. Dvalishvili.

Lightweight

Weight limit: (146 to 155 lb; 66 to 70 kg)

Rankings updated on March 13, 2023, after UFC Fight Night: Yan vs. Dvalishvili.

Featherweight

Weight limit: (136 to 145 lb; 60 to 66 kg)

Rankings updated on March 13, 2023, after UFC Fight Night: Yan vs. Dvalishvili.

Bantamweight

Weight limit: (126 to 135 lb; 57 to 61 kg)

Rankings updated on March 13, 2023, after UFC Fight Night: Yan vs. Dvalishvili.

Flyweight

Weight limit: (116 to 125 lb; 53 to 57 kg)

Rankings updated on March 13, 2023, after UFC Fight Night: Yan vs. Dvalishvili.

Women's Bantamweight

Weight limit: (126 to 135 lb; 57 to 61 kg)

Rankings updated on March 13, 2023, after UFC Fight Night: Yan vs. Dvalishvili.

Women's Flyweight

Weight limit: (116 to 125 lb; 53 to 57 kg)

Rankings updated on March 13, 2023, after UFC Fight Night: Yan vs. Dvalishvili.

Women's Strawweight

Weight limit: (106 to 115 lb; 48 to 52 kg)

Rankings updated on March 13, 2023, after UFC Fight Night: Yan vs. Dvalishvili.

See also
 List of undefeated mixed martial artists
 List of current UFC fighters
 List of UFC champions
 Bellator MMA Rankings

References

External links
 

MMA UFC
Mixed martial arts lists
Rankings